Sara may refer to:

Arts, media and entertainment

Film and television
 Sara (1992 film), 1992 Iranian film by Dariush Merhjui
 Sara (1997 film), 1997 Polish film starring Bogusław Linda
 Sara (2010 film), 2010 Sri Lankan Sinhala thriller directed by Nishantha Pradeep
 Sara (2015 film), 2015 Hong Kong psychological thriller
 Sara (1976 TV series), 1976 American western series
 Sara (1985 TV series), 1985 American situation comedy
 Sara (Belgian TV series), 2007–08 Flemish telenovella on Belgian television
 "Sara" (Arrow episode), an episode of Arrow

Music
 Sara (band), a Finnish band
 "Sara" (Bob Dylan song), a song by Bob Dylan for the 1976 album Desire
 "Sara" (Fleetwood Mac song), a song by Fleetwood Mac from the 1979 LP Tusk
 "Sara" (Starship song), a song by Starship from the 1985 album Knee Deep in the Hoopla
"Sara", a song by Bill Champlin from the 1981 LP Runaway
 "Sarah" (disambiguation)#Music, songs

Other entertainment
 Sara (play), or Miss Sara Sampson, 1755 play by the Enlightenment philosopher Gotthold Ephraim Lessing

Ethnic groups and languages
 Sara people, an ethnic group in central Africa
 Sara languages, a language group spoken mostly in southern Chad
 Sara language (Indonesia), a language spoken in Kalimantan in Indonesia

Legislation
 Species At Risk Act, Canadian legislation to protect endangered or threatened organisms and their habitats
 Superfund Amendments & Reauthorization Act (SARA), U.S. federal program to fund the cleanup of sites contaminated with hazardous substances and pollutants

Names
 Sara (given name), a variant of the given name Sarah

People with this given name

 Sara of St. Gilles, fourteenth century physician
 Sara Duterte, 15th Vice President of the Philippines
 Sara bint Faisal Al Saud, Saudi royal
 Sara bint Mashour Al Saud, Saudi royal
 Sara bint Talal Al Saud, Saudi royal
 Sara bint Ahmed Al Sudairi, Saudi royal
 Sara Bareilles, American singer-songwriter

Fictional characters
 Sara in the Tooniverse animated television series 
 Sara (Battle Angel Alita) in the manga Battle Angel Alita
 Sara (Chaotic) in the animated science fantasy television series Chaotic
 Sara Lance, American superhero Arrowverse franchise
 Sara Tokimura, from the Tokusatsu series, Choushinsei Flashman.
 Sara (mermaid) in the manga and anime series Mermaid Melody Pichi Pichi Pitch
 Sara (Over the Garden Wall) in the animated television miniseries Over the Garden Wall
 Sara in the Wee Sing 1988 film Grandpa's Magical Toys
 Sara Kujou, a playable characeter from Genshin Impact.

People with this surname
 Mia Sara (born 1967), American actress
 Máret Ánne Sara (born 1983), Norwegian Sami artist and author

Organizations
 San Antonio River Authority, a regional authority in the state of Texas, U.S.
 Scottish Amateur Rowing Association, the governing body for the sport of rowing in Scotland
 Severn Area Rescue Association, a search and rescue organisation covering parts of the River Severn, U.K.
 South African African Rugby Board, a former governing body for black rugby union players
 Southern African Railway Association, an association of railway companies
 State Administration for Religious Affairs, a department of the Chinese Government
 Stichting Academisch Rekencentrum Amsterdam, a Dutch university and research computing cooperative

Places
 Sara/Sare, a village in Labourd, France
 Sara, Iran, a village in Kurdistan Province, Iran
 Sara, Kerman, a village in Kerman Province, Iran
 Sara Rural District, an administrative subdivision of Kurdistan Province, Iran
 Sara, Iloilo, a municipality in the Philippines
 Sara Province, a province of Bolivia
 Sar'a, a former village near Jerusalem
 Nərimanabad, Lankaran or Sara, a village and municipality in Azerbaijan
 Sara, Washington, a town in Clark County
 Lake Sara, a reservoir in Effingham County, Illinois, United States

Science and technology
 Saab AB RäkneAutomat (SARA) computer, a calculating machine
 "Sara" or Apple III, a business-oriented personal computer
 Saturate, aromatic, resin and asphaltene, fractions in crude oil
 Smad Anchor for Receptor Activation, a protein
 South African Regional Aircraft (SARA) developed by Denel
 Standard Generalized Markup Language (SGML) Aware Retrieval Application (SARA), a text-searching system that led to the Xaira architecture

Other uses
 533 Sara, a minor planet
 Sara (horse), a breed of small horse from the Logone River area in Chad and Cameroon
 Scanning, Analysis, Response, and Assessment (SARA), a problem-solving model used in policing

See also
 Saraa (disambiguation)
 Sarah (disambiguation)
 Sareh, several people with this name
 Saria (disambiguation)
 Sarra (disambiguation)
 Sera (disambiguation)
 Sura (disambiguation)
 Šara (disambiguation)